Jean-Jacques Auberson (died September 1964) was a Swiss field hockey player. He competed in the men's tournament at the 1928 Summer Olympics.

References

External links
 

Year of birth missing
1964 deaths
Swiss male field hockey players
Olympic field hockey players of Switzerland
Field hockey players at the 1928 Summer Olympics
Place of birth missing